Roman Kotliński (born March 15, 1967 in Koło) is a Polish publisher, writer, journalist and politician; formerly he was Roman Catholic priest during 3 years. He published a trilogy Byłem księdzem (I was a priest) and in March 2000 he began publishing the newspaper "Fakty i Mity", left-wing and anticlerical oriented weekly magazine. He was member of Democratic Left Alliance for several years, then become co-founder of Reason Party. In the October 2011 parliamentary elections, he was elected to the Sejm as a candidate of the Palikot's Movement receiving 17 720 votes in Łódź district.

Roman Kotliński believes that Grzegorz Piotrowski abducted Jerzy Popiełuszko but didn't kill him. "Fakty i Mity" cooperated with Grzegorz Piotrowski.

Sources 
 lewica.pl: Łódzkie: Roman Kotliński liderem listy Ruchu Palikota (Polish)

1967 births
Cardinal Stefan Wyszyński University in Warsaw alumni
Your Movement politicians
Democratic Left Alliance politicians
Living people
Polish journalists
Members of the Polish Sejm 2011–2015
People from Koło County
Laicized Roman Catholic priests
Former Roman Catholics